James Wesley Hendrix (born 1977) is a United States district judge of the United States District Court for the Northern District of Texas and former assistant United States attorney for the same district.  He presides over the Northern District's Lubbock, Abilene, and San Angelo Divisions, which account for 47 of the Northern District's 100 counties, and span an area larger than Pennsylvania.

Early life and education 

Hendrix was born in Lubbock, Texas, and graduated from Lubbock High School. He received a Bachelor of Arts, with honors, in 2000 from the University of Chicago, where he was selected as a student marshal and inducted into Phi Beta Kappa. He earned his Juris Doctor, with high honors, in 2003 from the University of Texas School of Law, where he served on the Texas Law Review and was selected as a chancellor.

Legal and academic career 

After graduating from law school, Hendrix began his legal career as a law clerk to Judge Patrick Higginbotham of the United States Court of Appeals for the Fifth Circuit, in which capacity he served from 2003 to 2004.

Between 2004 and 2007, he was an associate at Baker Botts, practicing complex commercial and intellectual-property litigation in state and federal courts. His practice covered a wide range of civil matters, including energy, wage-and-hour, patent, information-technology, real estate, and employment litigation.  He represented both plaintiffs and defendants.

In 2007, he began work as an assistant United States attorney for the Northern District of Texas, representing the United States at trial and on appeal.  He helped prosecute Hosam Smadi, who was convicted of attempting to use a weapon of mass destruction in a downtown Dallas skyscraper. He also briefed and argued the Dallas City Hall corruption case, where the Fifth Circuit affirmed the bribery, extortion, and money-laundering convictions and sentences of multiple defendants.  He argued over 25 appeals at the Fifth and Seventh Circuits, including two en banc arguments, and served as sole counsel in over 350 appeals involving, among other things, terrorism, public corruption, organized crime, child exploitation, violent crime, and financial fraud.  He also served on various trial teams—trying cases, briefing and arguing dispositive motions, and handling sentencing hearings.  He regularly taught courses at the Department of Justice’s National Advocacy Center and served as a CLE instructor.

Hendrix became chief of the appellate division in 2012. As chief, he served as the office’s lead appellate litigator and as a member of the senior management team. He regularly coordinated with the Department of Justice’s Criminal Division Appellate Section and the Office of the Solicitor General regarding cases appealed to and argued before the U.S. Supreme Court. In 2015, he began serving on the Appellate Chiefs Working Group for the United States Attorney General's Advisory Committee. In 2017, he became Chair of the Appellate Chiefs Working Group and a member of the Attorney General's Advisory Committee.

Hendrix teaches courses about federal sentencing law and policy as an adjunct professor at Texas Tech University School of Law. In 2020, Texas Tech University's School of Law Alumni Association selected Hendrix to receive the Outstanding Service Award.

Federal judicial service

Expired nomination to district court under Obama

On March 15, 2016, President Barack Obama nominated Hendrix to serve as a United States District Judge of the United States District Court for the Northern District of Texas, to the seat vacated by Judge Jorge Antonio Solis, who retired on May 1, 2016. On September 7, 2016, a hearing before the Senate Judiciary Committee was held on  his nomination. His nomination expired on January 3, 2017, with the end of the 114th Congress.

Renomination to district court under Trump 

On January 16, 2019, President Donald Trump announced his intent to renominate Hendrix to serve as a United States district judge for the United States District Court for the Northern District of Texas. On January 17, 2019, his nomination was sent to the Senate. President Trump nominated Hendrix to the seat vacated by Judge Samuel Ray Cummings, who assumed senior status on December 31, 2014. On April 4, 2019, his nomination was reported out of committee by a 22–0 vote. On July 30, 2019, the Senate voted 85–5 to invoke cloture on his nomination. His nomination was confirmed later that day by a 89–1 vote. He received his judicial commission on August 8, 2019.

See also
 Barack Obama judicial appointment controversies

References

External links 
 

1977 births
Living people
20th-century American lawyers
21st-century American judges
21st-century American lawyers
Assistant United States Attorneys
Judges of the United States District Court for the Northern District of Texas
People associated with Baker Botts
People from Lubbock, Texas
Lubbock High School alumni
Texas lawyers
United States district court judges appointed by Donald Trump
University of Chicago alumni
University of Texas School of Law alumni